The Year of the Everlasting Storm is a 2021 American anthology film featuring segments directed by Jafar Panahi, Anthony Chen, Malik Vitthal, Laura Poitras, Dominga Sotomayor, David Lowery and Apichatpong Weerasethakul.

The film had its world premiere at the Cannes Film Festival on July 14, 2021. It was released on September 3, 2021, by Neon.

Plot

Production
In May 2021, it was announced Jafar Panahi, Anthony Chen, Malik Vitthal, Laura Poitras, Dominga Sotomayor, David Lowery and Apichatpong Weerasethakul had directed an anthology film, with Neon producing and distributing.

Release
The film had its world premiere at the Cannes Film Festival on July 14, 2021. and was released on September 3, 2021.

Reception
The Year of the Everlasting Storm holds a 94% approval rating on review aggregator website Rotten Tomatoes, based on 31 reviews, with a weighted average of 7.40/10. The site's consensus states: "The Year of the Everlasting Storm presents a diverse assortment of filmmakers offering a varied yet compelling response to shared trauma".

References

External links
 
 

2021 films
American anthology films
Films directed by Jafar Panahi
Films directed by Laura Poitras
Films directed by David Lowery
Films directed by Apichatpong Weerasethakul
Neon (distributor) films
2020s English-language films